Cristian Gutiérrez Vizcaíno (born 30 November 2000) is a Spanish footballer who plays as a left winger for Málaga CF.

Club career
Born in Marbella, Málaga, Andalusia, Gutiérrez represented local sides CD Vázquez Cultural and CD Peña Los Compadres as a youth before making his senior debut with AD Pablo Picasso CF during the 2016–17 season, in Tercera Andaluza. In 2017, he moved to Marbella FC, also appearing with the first team in Segunda División B.

On 28 June 2018, Gutiérrez joined Granada CF and returned to youth football. He renewed his contract with the Nazaríes on 27 June of the following year, and subsequently started to feature with farm team CD Huétor Vega in Tercera División.

On 4 June 2020, Gutiérrez further extended his contract with Granada until 2022, and was loaned to Atzeneta UE in the third division on 11 September. Upon returning in June 2021, he was assigned to the reserves in Segunda División RFEF.

On 13 June 2022, Gutiérrez moved to another reserve team, Atlético Malagueño in Tercera Federación. He made his debut with the main squad on 12 October, coming on as a second-half substitute for Jozabed in a 1–0 Segunda División away loss against CD Leganés.

References

External links

2000 births
Living people
People from Marbella
Sportspeople from the Province of Málaga
Spanish footballers
Footballers from Andalusia
Association football wingers
Segunda División players
Segunda División B players
Segunda Federación players
Tercera Federación players
Divisiones Regionales de Fútbol players
Marbella FC players
CD Huétor Vega players
Club Recreativo Granada players
Atzeneta UE players
Atlético Malagueño players
Málaga CF players